Chueo-tang or loach soup is a tang (soup) made from pond loach, a freshwater fish. The southwestern Korean city of Namwon is known for its version of the dish.

Etymology 
Chueo is a nickname for pond loach, called mikkuraji in Korean. Tang means soup.

History and tradition 
As irrigated rice paddies are drained after chubun (autumnal equinox), chubby pond loaches, ready for hibernation, are easily caught in the ditches dug around paddy fields. Chueo-tang (추어탕) is often a featured dish in banquets for the elderly.

In Hanyang (now Seoul) during the Joseon era, the guild of licensed panhandlers mandated that its members beg only for bap (cooked rice),  not banchan (side dishes) or guk (soup). (The practice was intended to maintain dignity and differentiate members from unlicensed beggars.) As an accompaniment to the rice, Panhandlers hunted pond loaches and made chueo-tang. They were also granted the exclusive rights to sell chueo-tang in the city.

Preparation 
Pond loaches are boiled in water until very tender, and sieved to remove bones and skins. The sieved flesh along with beef or chicken broth is then boiled again and seasoned with gochujang (chili paste), doenjang (soybean paste), grated ginger, and ground black pepper. Vegetable ingredients include mung bean sprouts, Asian royal fern, scallions, napa cabbages, and mustard greens. The soup is often served with ground chopi peppercorns, along with Korean mint leaves (in Yeongnam region) or perilla powder (in Honam region).

See also 

 Dojō nabe, Japanese pond loach stew
 List of soups

References 

Fish dishes
Korean soups and stews